Papaipema speciosissima, the osmunda borer or regal fern borer, is a species of cutworm or dart moth in the family Noctuidae. It was described by Augustus Radcliffe Grote and Coleman Townsend Robinson in 1868 and is found in North America.

The MONA or Hodges number for Papaipema speciosissima is 9482.

References

 Crabo, L.; Davis, M.; Hammond, P.; Mustelin, T. & Shepard, J. (2013). "Five new species and three new subspecies of Erebidae and Noctuidae (Insecta, Lepidoptera) from Northwestern North America, with notes on Chytolita Grote (Erebidae) and Hydraecia Guenée (Noctuidae)". ZooKeys. 264: 85-123.
 Lafontaine, D. & Troubridge, J. (2010). "Two new species of the Euxoa westermanni species-group from Canada (Lepidoptera, Noctuidae, Noctuinae)". ZooKeys. 39: 255-262.
 Lafontaine, J. Donald & Schmidt, B. Christian (2010). "Annotated check list of the Noctuoidea (Insecta, Lepidoptera) of North America north of Mexico". ZooKeys. vol. 40, 1-239.

Further reading

 Arnett, Ross H. (2000). American Insects: A Handbook of the Insects of America North of Mexico. CRC Press.

External links

 Butterflies and Moths of North America
 NCBI Taxonomy Browser, Papaipema speciosissima

Papaipema
Moths described in 1868
Moths of North America
Taxa named by Augustus Radcliffe Grote
Taxa named by Coleman Townsend Robinson